Irish inventions and discoveries are objects, processes or techniques which owe their existence either partially or entirely to an Irish person. Often, things which are discovered for the first time, are also called "inventions", and in many cases, there is no clear line between the two. Below is a list of such inventions.

Pre-history
Ogham alphabet.
Iomániocht (Scuaib/Camán/Ioman) -  precursors to modern Hurling

6th century
The sacrament of confession
Penitential

14th century
Caid (precursor to modern Gaelic football).
Whiskey

17th century
Irish road bowling.
1661: Modern chemistry founded by Robert Boyle with the publication of The Sceptical Chymist.
1662: Boyle's law discovered by Robert Boyle.
1680s: European adaptation of Drinking chocolate - Hans Sloane. However, this "adaption" is highly disputed. According  to historian James Delbourgo, the Jamaicans were brewing “a hot beverage brewed from shavings of freshly harvested cacao, boiled with milk and cinnamon” as far back as 1494.

18th century
1730: The concept of an entrepreneur - Richard Cantillon.

19th century
1805: Beaufort scale created by Francis Beaufort.
1809: Milk of Magnesia discovered by James Murray.
1813: Clanny safety lamp created by William Reid Clanny.
1820: 30 January, Edward Bransfield discovered the Antarctic Continent (mainland, islands were discovered earlier). 
1820: Modern meat curing and the Bacon Rasher were invented by Henry Denny, a Waterford butcher, in 1820
1821: The development of "Extra Stout" beer by The Second Arthur Guinness and others.
1831: Column still design enhanced and patented by Aeneas Coffey.
1831: William Brooke O'Shaughnessy pioneered the cure for cholera through Intravenous therapy
1832: The Kyanizing process for preserving wood, created by John Howard Kyan.
1834: The game of Croquet.
1836: Induction coil created by Nicholas Callan.
1843: Quaternion (a mathematical entity) first described by Sir William Rowan Hamilton.
1844: Hollow needle in syringe created by Francis Rynd.
1846: Seismology founded by Robert Mallet, who used dynamite explosions to measure the speed of elastic waves in surface rocks - pioneering and coining the word 'seismology'.
1848: Kelvin scale created by William Thomson, 1st Baron Kelvin.
1851: Binaural stethoscope created by Arthur Leared.
1856: Icosian calculus discovered by Sir William Rowan Hamilton.
1859:  Greenhouse Effect theory proven by John Tyndall.
1865: The first Transatlantic telegraph cable pioneered by William Thomson, 1st Baron Kelvin on Valentia Island.
1866: The Standard drop method of hanging developed by Dr Samuel Haughton.
1874:
Electron introduced as a concept by George Johnstone Stoney.
Brennan torpedo created by Louis Brennan.
1879: The rules of Hurling first standardised with the foundation of the Irish Hurling Union.
1880: Boycott triggered by Charles Boycott over a dispute with the Irish Land League.
1884: Steam Turbine: Compound Steam Turbine developed by Anglo-Irish engineer Charles Algernon Parsons.
1885: The Cream Cracker was invented by Joseph Haughton in his home in Dublin and first manufactured by William Jacob in his bakery in Dublin.
1888: Gregg Shorthand created by John Robert Gregg.
1894: Joly colour screen created by John Joly.
1894: cohesion-tension theory proposed by John Joly and Henry Horatio Dixon at Trinity College Dublin
1897: Modern submarine design created by John Philip Holland.
Saccharimeter created by Rev John Jellet from Cashel, County Tipperary (1817–1888).

20th century
1901: Reflector sight created by Howard Grubb.
1914: Radiotherapy developed by John Joly.
1928: Three point linkage, patented by Harry Ferguson.
1930: Nickel-zinc battery created by James J. Drumm.
1931: Sudocrem was developed by Dublin-based pharmacist Thomas Smith.
1930s: The first disintegration of an atomic nucleus by artificially accelerated protons (splitting the atom) discovered by Ernest Walton et al.
1946: Ejection seat - first live test of a reliable, successful modern ejection seat developed by James Martin
1940s: World first duty free airport shop at Shannon Airport, created by Brendan O'Regan
1950: Joseph 'Spud' Murphy and his employee Seamus Burke produced the world's first seasoned crisps: Cheese & Onion and Salt & Vinegar. Companies worldwide sought to buy the rights to Tayto's technique.
1954: Clofazimine first synthesized by a medical research team led by Cork man Vincent Barry at Trinity College, Dublin.
1965: Portable defibrillator created by Frank Pantridge.
1967: Pulsar discovered by Jocelyn Bell Burnell.

See also
List of Irish dishes

References

Science and technology in Ireland
Irish
 
Inventions and discoveries